Legislative elections were held in New Caledonia on 18 November 1984. They had originally been planned for July, but were postponed due to threats by the Independence Front to boycott and disrupt the vote. Most members of the Front subsequently merged into the Kanak and Socialist National Liberation Front in September, and proceeded to boycott the elections. As a result, the Rally for Caledonia in the Republic won 34 of the 42 seats. Following the elections, Dick Ukeiwé became President of the Government.

Conduct
The elections were marred by violence; several houses, town halls and shops were set on fire, with FLNKS members clashing with security forces. FLNKS also took a French administrator hostage on Lifou Island and occupied a police station in north-east of the territory. On election day 200 Kanaks entered a polling station in Canala and destroyed ballot papers.

Results
Overall voter turnout was just over 50%, but estimated to be only 15% amongst the Kanak community.

Elected members

Aftermath
Violence continued after the elections; FLNKS members occupied the police station in Thio on 20 November and held five policemen hostage. Rebels set up a 'Govermment of Kanaky' in early December, headed by Jean-Marie Tjibaou. European settlers in Hienghène killed ten FLNKS militants on 5 December, including two brothers of Tjibaou.

Dick Ukeiwé became President of the Government, heading a ten-member cabinet.

References

New Caledonia
Elections in New Caledonia
1984 in New Caledonia
New Caledonia
Election and referendum articles with incomplete results